Lawrence Grant Leslie (17 March 1935 – 4 June 2019) was a Scottish professional footballer who played as a goalkeeper for Hibernian, Airdrie, West Ham United, Stoke City, Millwall and Southend United. Internationally, he represented Scotland on five occasions.

Early life
Leslie was born in Edinburgh. As a boy, he was run over by a truck and advised by doctors that he may not regain the ability to walk.

Playing career

In Scotland
Leslie began playing football with Hawkhill Amateurs. In the early 1950s, he turned semi-pro and joined Newtongrange Star. He played for his regimental side at Oswestry after joining the Royal Artillery in 1956. Lawrie signed pro forms with Hibernian following a trial that Army compatriot and Hibs player Jock Buchanan had suggested he apply for. After initially competing for his place with Tommy Younger, he became the club's first choice 'keeper and was in the Hibs side that reached the 1958 Scottish Cup Final, which they lost 1–0 to Clyde. After playing 98 matches for the Easter Road side he moved to Airdrie in November 1959 for £4,475. Leslie spent two seasons at Broomfield Park and became club captain. He was later inducted into the club's Hall of Fame.

In England
Leslie moved to West Ham United in 1961 for £14,000. He won 'Hammer of the Year' at the end of his first season, becoming the first goalkeeper to earn the accolade. The following season, Leslie suffered a broken leg in a game against Bolton Wanderers on 3 November 1962, but managed to regain fitness for the final four games of the campaign. After falling out of favour at West Ham at the start of the 1963–64 season - by this time Leslie's replacement, Jim Standen had established himself as the Hammers' first choice goalkeeper-, he requested a transfer.

After 61 league and cup appearances for the east London club, Leslie joined Stoke City for a fee of £14,000 in October 1963 and in his first season helped the club to reach the League Cup Final. Leslie played in the first leg of the final at Stoke's Victoria Ground, a 1–1 draw, but he was injured for the decisive second leg. Reserve 'keeper Bobby Irvine stepped in and Stoke lost the game 3–2. In the 1964–65 season, Leslie made the number one spot his own as the missed just two matches out of 50. He lost his first choice status in 1965–66 due to the emergence of John Farmer and he left in the summer of 1966 for Millwall. He spent two seasons at The Den before finishing his career with Southend United.

International
Leslie won five caps for the Scottish national team while with Airdrie, all during the 1960–61 season. His international debut came on 22 October 1960, against Wales; Scotland lost the game 2–0, but his performance earned many plaudits. He was due to play for Scotland in the infamous 9–3 defeat by England at Wembley, but he was injured one week beforehand and Frank Haffey was selected instead.

Later life
After his retirement from playing, Leslie coached at Southend and went on to a role as trainer-coach at Millwall. He was later involved in coaching schools football.

Leslie died in June 2019, aged 84.

Career statistics
Source:

International
Source:

References

External links
 
 
 London Hearts profile

1935 births
2019 deaths
Footballers from Edinburgh
Scottish footballers
Scotland international footballers
Scottish Football League representative players
Scottish Junior Football Association players
Scottish Football League players
English Football League players
Association football goalkeepers
Newtongrange Star F.C. players
Hibernian F.C. players
Airdrieonians F.C. (1878) players
West Ham United F.C. players
Stoke City F.C. players
Millwall F.C. players
Southend United F.C. players
Southend United F.C. non-playing staff
Millwall F.C. non-playing staff
Royal Artillery soldiers
20th-century British Army personnel